Aigantighe Art Gallery is an art gallery located in Timaru, New Zealand. It was established in 1956 and holds the South Island's third-largest public art museum collection. It also features a sculpture garden with work from New Zealand and international sculptors.

The Grant family, who had migrated to Timaru from Scotland, founded the gallery in 1956. It is located in a 1908 mansion, which was extended in 1978 with an additional wing for extended exhibition space.

The 1908 mansion was designed by the architect  James S. Turnbull (1864–1947). On 23 June 1983, the building was classified D by the New Zealand Historic Places Trust (now Heritage New Zealand. With the change in classification system, the building was designated a Category II historic place.

References

1956 establishments in New Zealand
Art galleries in New Zealand
Timaru
Heritage New Zealand Category 2 historic places in Canterbury, New Zealand